Tanya Nicole Samarzich Ruiz (born 28 December 1994) is an American-born Mexican footballer who played as a forward for Liga MX Femenil club CF Monterrey. She was a member of the Mexico women's national team.

Early life
Samarzich was born in West Covina, California and raised in nearby Upland to a Serbian father and a Mexican mother.

References

External links 
 
 
 

1994 births
Living people
Citizens of Mexico through descent
Mexican women's footballers
Women's association football forwards
Mexico women's international footballers
Pan American Games bronze medalists for Mexico
Pan American Games medalists in football
Footballers at the 2011 Pan American Games
Mexican people of Serbian descent
Liga MX Femenil players
C.F. Monterrey (women) players
American women's soccer players
Soccer players from California
Sportspeople from West Covina, California
American sportspeople of Mexican descent
American people of Serbian descent
USC Trojans women's soccer players
Kentucky Wildcats women's soccer players
Medalists at the 2011 Pan American Games